is one of 24 wards of Osaka, Japan.

Points of interest
Nagai Park
Nagai Botanical Garden
Nagai Stadium
Yanmar Field Nagai
Yodoko Sakura Stadium

Shopping
Komagawa Shopping Arcade (駒川商店街)

Headquarters
Sangaria

Train stations
JR West
Kansai Main Line (Yamatoji Line): Tobu-shijo-mae Station
Kintetsu Railway
Minami Osaka Line: Kita-Tanabe Station - Imagawa Station - Harinakano Station - Yata Station
Osaka Metro
Tanimachi Line: Tanabe Station - Komagawa-Nakano Station

External links

Official website of Higashisumiyoshi 

Wards of Osaka